Bevent is an unincorporated community located in the towns of Bevent and Reid, Marathon County, Wisconsin, United States.

Notes

Unincorporated communities in Marathon County, Wisconsin
Unincorporated communities in Wisconsin